Kapiro is a locality in the Far North District of Northland, New Zealand. State Highway 10 passes through Kapiro. Waipapa is 2.7 km south, and Kaeo is 19 km northwest, by road.

History
The Kapiro block was a designated Kauri gum reserve after 1898 to restrict the harvesting of gum. The gum was depleted by 1919, and suggestions were made to use the land for settlement of returning soldiers from World War I, or planting trees on it. The land was covered with a noxious weed, hakea.

An experimental farm was established in the late 1920s. This was not promising at first, but by the mid 1940s the experiment was much more successful. Kapiro became a rich dairying area.

A vineyard was established from 2007.

Demographics

Lake Manuwai-Kapiro had a population of 2,133 at the 2018 New Zealand census, an increase of 237 people (12.5%) since the 2013 census, and an increase of 489 people (29.7%) since the 2006 census. There were 744 households, comprising 1,077 males and 1,056 females, giving a sex ratio of 1.02 males per female. The median age was 46.7 years (compared with 37.4 years nationally), with 420 people (19.7%) aged under 15 years, 297 (13.9%) aged 15 to 29, 1,032 (48.4%) aged 30 to 64, and 387 (18.1%) aged 65 or older.

Ethnicities were 91.3% European/Pākehā, 16.6% Māori, 2.7% Pacific peoples, 3.2% Asian, and 1.7% other ethnicities. People may identify with more than one ethnicity.

The percentage of people born overseas was 24.3, compared with 27.1% nationally.

Although some people chose not to answer the census's question about religious affiliation, 62.2% had no religion, 27.0% were Christian, 0.1% were Muslim, 1.0% were Buddhist and 2.8% had other religions.

Of those at least 15 years old, 330 (19.3%) people had a bachelor's or higher degree, and 240 (14.0%) people had no formal qualifications. The median income was $30,300, compared with $31,800 nationally. 255 people (14.9%) earned over $70,000 compared to 17.2% nationally. The employment status of those at least 15 was that 888 (51.8%) people were employed full-time, 297 (17.3%) were part-time, and 45 (2.6%) were unemployed.

References

Far North District
Populated places in the Northland Region